The Heart of It All is the seventh studio album by American country music artist Earl Thomas Conley. It was released on April 29, 1988 via RCA Records. The album includes the singles "What She Is (Is a Woman in Love)", "We Believe in Happy Endings", his duet with Emmylou Harris, "What I'd Say", "Love Out Loud" and "You Must Not Be Drinking Enough".

Track listing

Chart performance

References

1988 albums
Earl Thomas Conley albums
Albums produced by Emory Gordy Jr.
RCA Records albums